Indotyphlops braminus, commonly known as the brahminy blind snake and other names, is a non-venomous blind snake species found mostly in Africa and Asia, but has been introduced in many other parts of the world. They are completely fossorial (i.e., burrowing) animals, with habits and appearance similar to earthworms, for which they are often mistaken, although close examination reveals tiny scales rather than the annular segments characteristic of true earthworms. The species is parthenogenetic and all known specimens have been female. The specific name is a Latinized form of the word Brahmin. No subspecies are currently recognized.

Description
The head and tail are superficially similar as the head and neck are indistinct. Unlike other snakes, the head scales resemble the body scales. The eyes are barely discernible as small dots under the head scales. The tip of the tail has a small, pointed spur. Along the body are fourteen rows of dorsal scales. Coloration ranges from charcoal gray, silver-gray, light yellow-beige, purplish, or infrequently albino, the ventral surface more pale. Coloration of the juvenile form is similar to that of the adult. Behavior ranges from lethargic to energetic, quickly seeking the cover of soil or leaf litter to avoid light.

The tiny eyes are covered with translucent scales, rendering these snakes almost entirely blind. The eyes cannot form images, but are still capable of registering light intensity.

Common names
I. braminus is variously known as the brahminy blind snake, flowerpot snake, common blind snake, island blind snake, teliya snake, and Hawaiian blind snake. The moniker "flowerpot snake" derives from the snake's incidental introduction to various parts of the world through the plant trade.

"Kurudi" is the common Malayalam term which refers to braminus.

"Sirupaambu" is the common Tamil term which refers to braminus.

Geographic range
Probably originally native to Africa and Asia, it is an introduced species in many parts of the world, including Australia, the Americas, and Oceania.

The type locality given is "Vishakhapatam" [India].

Indigenous range
In Africa, it has been reported in Uganda, DRC, Egypt, Kenya, Senegal, Benin, Togo, Ivory Coast, Cameroon, Zambia, Zimbabwe, Somalia, Zanzibar, Tanzania, Mozambique, South Africa (an isolated colony in Cape Town and Natal Midlands, also about eight have been found in Lephalale, Limpopo Province at the Medupi Power Station during construction), Madagascar, the Comoro Islands, Mauritius, the Mascarene Islands and the Seychelles. It has also been found in Libya and Nossi Be (= Nosy Bé).

In Asia, it occurs in the Arabian Peninsula, Lebanon, Iran, Pakistan, Nepal, mainland India, the Maldives, the Lakshadweep Islands (where it is the only snake reported), Sri Lanka, Maldives, Bangladesh, the Andaman Islands, the Nicobar Islands, Myanmar, Singapore, the Malay Peninsula, Thailand, Cambodia, Vietnam, Laos, Hainan, southern China, Hong Kong, Taiwan, and the Ryukyu Islands of Okinawashima and Miyakoshima.

In Maritime Southeast Asia, it occurs on Sumatra and nearby islands (the Riau Archipelago, Bangka, Belitung and Nias), Borneo, Sulawesi, the Philippines, Butung, Salajar, Ternate, Halmahera, Buru, Ceram, Ambon, Saparua, Java, Bali, Lombok, Sumbawa, Madura, Flores, Lomblen, Sumba, Timor, East Timor, Kai Island, the Aru Islands, New Guinea (Western Papua and Papua New Guinea), New Britain, and Bougainville Island.

It occurs in the Cocos (Keeling) Islands, and on Christmas Island.

Introduced range
In Australia, it occurs in the Northern Territory near Darwin, and in parts of Queensland.

In Oceania, it occurs on Palau, Guam, Fiji, Saipan, Hawaiian Islands and Tahiti in French Polynesia.

In the Americas, it occurs in the United States (California, Connecticut, Florida, Georgia, Louisiana, Massachusetts, Arizona, Hawaii and Texas), western and southern Mexico, Guatemala, Belize, Colombia, Barbados and on the Cayman Islands, Turks and Caicos Islands.

In Europe, it has been found in Spain, in the Canary Islands (on Tenerife and Gran Canaria), in Italy (on the island of Ischia), and in Malta; it is believed to have been introduced in soil imported with potted plants, and has been labeled potentially invasive to native fauna.

Habitat

Usually, they occur in urban and agricultural areas. These snakes live underground in ant and termite nests. They are also found under logs, moist leaves, stones and humus in wet forest, dry jungle, abandoned buildings, and even city gardens. The distribution and survival of this group of blind snakes directly reflect soil humidity and temperature.

Feeding
Their diet consists of the larvae, eggs, and pupae of ants and termites.

Reproduction
I. braminus is parthenogenetic, and all specimens collected so far have been female. They lay eggs or may bear live young. Up to eight offspring are produced, all female and genetically identical. They are triploid, and it has been proposed that the species be transferred to a new genus as Virgotyphlops braminus because of its obligate parthenogenetic nature.

References

Further reading

 Annandale N. 1906. Notes on the fauna of a desert tract in southern India. Part I. Batrachians and reptiles, with remarks on the reptiles of the desert region of the North-West Frontier. Mem. Asiatic Soc. Bengal, Calcutta 1: 183–202.
 Boulenger GA. 1893. Catalogue of the Snakes in the British Museum (Natural History). Volume I., Containing the Families Typhlopidæ ... London: Trustees of the British Museum (Natural History). (Taylor and Francis, printers). xiii + 448 pp. + Plates I-XXVIII. (Typhlops braminus, pp. 16–17).
 Daudin FM. 1802. Histoire Naturelle, Générale et Particulière des Reptiles. Tome septième [Volume 7]. Paris: F. Dufart. 436 pp.
 Hedges SB, Marion AB, Lipp KM, Marin J, Vidal N. 2014. A taxonomic framework for typhlopid snakes from the Caribbean and other regions (Reptilia, Squamata). Caribbean Herpetology (49): 1-61. (Indotyphlops braminus, new combination).
 Jones GS, Thomas LA, Wong K. 1995. "Ramphotyphlops braminus ". Herpetological Review 26 (4):210-211.
 Kelaart EF. 1854. Catalogue of reptiles collected in Ceylon. Ann. Mag. Nat. Hist., Second Series 13: 137–140.
 Kraus F, Carvalho D. 2001. The Risk to Hawai'i from Snakes. Pacific Science 55 (4): 409–417. PDF  at University of Hawai'i press. Accessed 20 April 2008.
 Nussbaum RA. 1980. The brahminy blind snake (Ramphotyphlops braminus) in the Seychelles Archipelago: Distribution, variation, and further evidence for parthenogenesis. Herpetologica 36 (3): 215–221.
 Oliver JA, Shaw CE. 1953. The amphibians and reptiles of the Hawaiian Islands. Zoologica, New York 38 (5): 65–95.
 O'Shea M, Halliday T. 2002. Smithsonian Handbooks: Reptiles and Amphibians.  London: DK Publishing. 256 pp. .
 Mizuno, T., & Kojima, Y. (2015). A blindsnake that decapitates its termite prey. Journal of Zoology, 297(3), 220–224.
 Owen R, Bowman DT Jr, Johnson SA. 1998. "Geographic Distribution. Ramphotyphlops braminus ". Herpetological Review 29 (2): 115.
Palmer, DD and RN Fisher.  2010.  "Geographic Distribution.  Ramphotyphlops braminus ". Herpetological Review 41 (4): 518.
 Thomas LA. 1997. "Geographic Distribution. Ramphotyphlops braminus ". Herpetological Review 28 (2): 98.
 Vijayakumar SP, David P. 2006. Taxonomy, Natural History, And Distribution Of The Snakes Of The Nicobar Islands (INDIA), Based On New Materials And With An Emphasis On Endemic Species. Russian Journal of Herpetology 13 (1): 11 – 40.
 Wall F. 1919. Notes on a collection of Snakes made in the Nilgiri Hills and the adjacent Wynaad. J. Bombay Nat. Hist. Soc. 26: 552–584.
 Wallach V. 1999. "Geographic distribution: Ramphotyphlops braminus ". Herpetological Review'' 30 (4): 236.

External links

 
 Ramphotyphlops braminus at Snakes of Japan. Accessed 30 August 2007.
 Ramphotyphlops braminus at WildHerps.com. Accessed 30 August 2007.
 R. braminus at ThailandSnakes.com. Accessed 22 December 2014.
 Indotyphlops braminus at the Tucson Herpetological Society.

Indotyphlops
Vertebrate parthenogenesis
Reptiles of Africa
Reptiles of Asia
Reptiles of Cambodia
Reptiles of China
Reptiles of India
Reptiles of Japan
Reptiles of Laos
Reptiles of Madagascar
Reptiles of Myanmar
Reptiles of Pakistan
Reptiles of the Philippines
Reptiles of Somalia
Reptiles of Taiwan
Reptiles of Tanzania
Reptiles of Thailand
Reptiles of Vietnam
Reptiles described in 1803
Snakes of Australia
Reptiles of the Canary Islands
Snakes of China
Snakes of Vietnam
Snakes of Asia
Unisexual animals
Reptiles of Borneo